Wapato can mean:

 Any of various plants in the genus Sagittaria
 Wapato, Washington, a town named after the plant in the State of Washington in the United States
 Wapato (YTB-788), a United States Navy tug in service from 1966 to 1996
 Sauvie Island, which was originally called Wapato Island
 Wapato Lake, a restored lake in what's now Washington and Yamhill counties
 Wapato Corrections Facility, a built but never opened jail in Multnomah County.